César Gallardo (17 February 1896 – 1989) was a Uruguayan fencer. He competed in the team foil event at the 1948 Summer Olympics.

References

External links
 

1896 births
1989 deaths
Uruguayan male foil fencers
Olympic fencers of Uruguay
Fencers at the 1948 Summer Olympics
Sportspeople from Montevideo
20th-century Uruguayan people